Valea Doftanei (Romanian for "Valley of the Doftana") is a commune in Prahova County, Muntenia, Romania. It is composed of two villages: Teșila (the commune centre) and Trăisteni.

The commune is located in the northern part of Prahova County, between the Prahova and Teleajen rivers, on the border with Brașov County. Its population primarily inhabits the central and southern areas, with the north being taken up by mountainous terrain.

Natives
 Ioan Apostol (born 1959), luger
 Gheorghe Vasile (born 1967), biathlete

References

Communes in Prahova County
Localities in Muntenia